Zachary Milo Ista (born April 7, 1985) is an American attorney and politician. An assistant state's attorney for Grand Forks County, he was appointed to the North Dakota House of Representatives in 2020 succeeding Matt Eidson. His 43rd district represents Grand Forks. Ista previously ran for a seat in the state house from the 13th district in 2006, while an undergraduate student at North Dakota State University.

References

External links

1985 births
Living people
North Dakota State University alumni
Washington College of Law alumni
People from West Fargo, North Dakota
21st-century American politicians
Democratic Party members of the North Dakota House of Representatives